James Joyce by Richard Ellmann was published in 1959 (a revised edition was released in 1982). It provides an intimate and detailed account of the life of Irish modernist James Joyce, which informs an understanding of this author's complex works.

Reception
Anthony Burgess was so impressed with the biographer's work that he claimed it to be "the greatest literary biography of the century." Edna O'Brien, the Irish novelist, remarked that "H. G. Wells said that Finnegans Wake was an immense riddle, and people find it too difficult to read. I have yet to meet anyone who has read and digested the whole of it—except perhaps my friend Richard Ellmann." Ellmann quotes extensively from Finnegans Wake as epigraphs in his biography of Joyce.

References

1959 non-fiction books
Works about James Joyce
Irish biographies
Biographies about writers